James Townsend (December 17, 1729 – May 24, 1790 in Jericho, then in Queens, now in Nassau County, New York) was an American politician from New York.

Life
Townsend was the son of Jacob Townsend (1692–1742) and Phebe (Seaman) Townsend (1699–1774). On April 2, 1757, he married Mary Hicks (1730–1796); they had seven children.

Townsend was a deputy to the 3rd and 4th New York Provincial Congresses in 1776. He was a member of the New York State Assembly in 1784, 1784-85, 1786, and 1787. He was elected as a Federalist to the 2nd United States Congress in April 1790, but died a month later, before his term began.

See also
 List of members-elect of the United States House of Representatives who never took their seats

Sources
The New York Civil List compiled by Franklin Benjamin Hough (pages 53, 92, 161ff and 310; Weed, Parsons and Co., 1858)
Congressional election result and death notice in Queens County in Olden Times by Henry Onderdonk Jr. (1865; page 74)
Transcript from James Townsend's family bible at

1729 births
1790 deaths
18th-century American politicians
Elected officials who died without taking their seats
Members of the New York Provincial Congress
Members of the New York State Assembly
New York (state) Federalists
People from Jericho, New York